The Wolverine–Hoosier Athletic Conference (WHAC) is a college athletic conference affiliated with the National Association of Intercollegiate Athletics (NAIA), and it's heaquartered in Livonia, Michigan. The conference consists of twelve colleges and universities located in the U.S. states of Michigan, Indiana, and Ohio. Founded in 1992, the conference was created as a successor group for the now-defunct NAIA District 23.

History

The WHAC announced on January 27, 2012, added bowling and lacrosse for both men and women as conference sports effective the fall of 2012, becoming the first NAIA conference to offer championships in these sports.

On October 13, 2016, the Council of Presidents unanimously voted to accept Rochester College (now Rochester University) into the conference beginning with the 2017–18 academic year.

Men's ice hockey was added as a conference sport effective the fall of 2017, making the WHAC the first conference in the NAIA to offer ice hockey as a conference championship sport.  Initially, the five conference members that sponsor ice hockey will participate in a conference championship. In July 2017, Concordia University Ann Arbor announced that the university will begin an ice hockey program and begin competition in the NAIA Division and WHAC Hockey Conference in the 2018–19 season.

Chronological timeline
 1992 - The Wolverine–Hoosier Athletic Conference (WHAC) was founded. Charter members included Aquinas College, Concordia College Ann Arbor (now Concordia University Ann Arbor), Cornerstone College (now Cornerstone College), Siena Heights College (now Siena Heights University), Spring Arbor College (now Spring Arbor University) and Tri-State University (now Trine University), effective beginning the 1992-93 academic year.
 1997 - Madonna University joined the WHAC, effective in the 1997-98 academic year.
 1998 - Indiana Institute of Technology (Indiana Tech) joined the WHAC, effective in the 1998-99 academic year.
 2003 - Tri-State left the WHAC and the NAIA to join the NCAA Division III ranks of the National Collegiate Athletic Association (NCAA) as an NCAA D-III Independent (which would later join the Michigan Intercollegiate Athletic Association (MIAA), effective beginning the 2004-05 academic year), effective after the 2002-03 academic year. 
 2004 - Spring Arbor left the WHAC to join the Mid-Central College Conference (MCCC; now the Crossroads League), effective after the 2003-04 academic year. 
 2004 - The University of Michigan–Dearborn joined the WHAC, effective in the 2004-05 academic year.
 2005 - Davenport University joined the WHAC, effective in the 2005-06 academic year.
 2010 - The University of Northwestern Ohio joined the WHAC, effective in the 2010-11 academic year.
 2011 - Lourdes University joined the WHAC, effective in the 2011-12 academic year.
 2012 - Lawrence Technological University and Marygrove College joined the WHAC, effective in the 2012-13 academic year.
 2016 - Two institutions joined the WHAC as affiliate members: Rochester College (now Rochester University) for baseball, and Spring Arbor re-joining for bowling, both effective in the 2016-17 academic year.
 2017 - Davenport left the WHAC and the NAIA to join the NCAA Division II ranks and the Great Lakes Intercollegiate Athletic Conference (GLIAC), effective after the 2016-17 academic year. 
 2017 - Rochester had uprgraded to join the WHAC for all sports, effective in the 2017-18 academic year.
 2017 - Marygrove left the WHAC as the school announced that it would close at the end of the fall 2017 semester, effective during the 2017-18 academic year.
 2018 - Cleary University joined the WHAC, effective in the 2018-19 academic year.
 2018 - Four institutions joined the WHAC as affiliate members: Bethel University of Indiana for women's lacrosse, Goshen College for men's volleyball, Huntington University for bowling, and Taylor University for men's lacrosse, all effective in the 2019 spring season (2018-19 school year).
 2019 - Mount Vernon Nazarene University joined the WHAC as an affiliate member for bowling; while Taylor added women's lacrosse to its WHAC affiliate membership, both effective in the 2019-20 academic year.
 2020 - Taylor left the WHAC as an affiliate member for women's lacrosse, effective after the 2020 spring season (2019-20 academic year).
 2020 - Four institutions joined the WHAC as affiliate members: Bethel (Ind.) adding bowling to its WHAC affiliate membership, Brescia University and Point Park University for competitive cheerleading, Marian University adding men's wrestling to its WHAC affiliate membership, and Mount Vernon Nazarene for men's volleyball, all effective in the 2020-21 academic year.

Member schools

Current members
The WHAC currently has 12 full members, all but one are private schools:

Notes

Affiliate members
The WHAC currently has nine affiliate members, all are private schools:

Notes

Former members
The WHAC had four former full members, all were private schools:

Notes

Former affiliate members
The WHAC had one former affiliate member, which was also a private school:

Notes

Membership timeline

Sports

WHAC offers 14 men's and 13 women's sports.

References

External links

 
College sports in Indiana
College sports in Michigan
Sports in Grand Rapids, Michigan
College ice hockey conferences in the United States
Sports organizations established in 1992
1992 establishments in the United States